Bhagaban Das (born 18 November 1974) is an Indian politician who is serving as a member of the Tripura Legislative Assembly from Pabiachara since 2018 representing the Bharatiya Janata Party. He became Minister of Welfare of Scheduled Castes of Tripura in 2021.

Personal life 
He was born in Ujan Dudhpur to Rakesh Chandra Das and Sushama Das. He is married to Soma Das and they both have 2 sons and 1 daughter.

Career 
He has joined Rashtriya Swayamsevak Sangh and worked for the Bharatiya Janata Party in the Assembly Election which was held during 1993. Later, he has worked as ‘Maha Mantri’ of Unakoti district. In 2008 and in 2013, he contested in the Assembly Election as a BJP candidate. In 2018, he was elected as an MLA of Tripura Legislative Assembly, and he is the currently the Minister of Welfare of Scheduled Castes of Tripura.

Controversy 

 Following the MLA's selection for a position as a cabinet minister, the TMC claimed that BJP MLA Bhagaban Das's SC certificate is a forgery and requested an investigation.
 Tripura's opposition wants a BJP's minister removed over allegations that his son was involved in a rape case. The youths in the building, led by the minister's son, gang-raped her.
 Tripura BJP minister compares the accusers of his son's rape to barking dogs, "Haathi chale bazaar kutte bhoke hazaar".

References 

Living people
1974 births
Tripura politicians
Bharatiya Janata Party politicians from Tripura
Tripura MLAs 2018–2023
State cabinet ministers of Tripura